Pensacola is a town in Mayes County, Oklahoma, United States. The population was 125 at the 2010 census, which represented a 76 percent increase from the figure of 71 recorded in 2000.

History
The history of Pensacola began circa 1840, with the establishment of a way station on the old Texas Road at the Cabin Creek Crossing of the Grand River. Here, Joseph Lynch Martin (a.k.a. "Greenbrier Joe") established a trading post called Pensacola.

The Union Army commandeered Pensacola as a supply station between Fort Scott, Kansas and Fort Gibson, Indian Territory. during the Civil War. Two battles between Union and Confederate forces occurred here, resulting in the destruction of Pensacola.

In 1909, James Sims Wilson, a settler from Kentucky, established a ranch north of Pensacola and east of Grand River. The Missouri, Oklahoma & Gulf Railroad came to this area in 1912. Its right of way crossed the Wilson ranch, and Wilson began planning a townsite that would be served by the Pensacola post office. He filed the Pensacola townsite plat in the office of the county clerk on April 2, 1912. Despite failure of the town bank in 1921 and the onset of the Great Depression, the announcement of a new dam project five miles east, there was hope for growth to return. A chamber of commerce formed, and the town incorporated in 1938.

Pensacola never became more than a small country town supported by farming and cattle ranching. It was surrounded on three sides by the Wilson ranch. Moreover, until the Pensacola Dam and good roads were completed in 1943, commerce was limited. The population declined from 109 in 1940 to 48 in 1950.

Geography
Pensacola is located at  (36.455433, -95.130226).

Demographics

As of the 2010 census the population of Pensacola was 125.  The racial and ethnic composition of the population was 78.4% white, 15.2% Native American, 0.8% from some other race and 5.6% from two or more races.  1.6% of the population was Mexican.

As of the census of 2000, there were 71 people, 26 households, and 19 families residing in the town. There were 31 housing units at an average density of 217.2 per square mile (85.5/km2). The racial makeup of the town was 76.06% White, 12.68% Native American, and 11.27% from two or more races.

There were 26 households, out of which 46.2% had children under the age of 18 living with them, 57.7% were married couples living together, 11.5% had a female householder with no husband present, and 26.9% were non-families. 23.1% of all households were made up of individuals, and 7.7% had someone living alone who was 65 years of age or older. The average household size was 2.73 and the average family size was 3.21.

In the town, the population was spread out, with 32.4% under the age of 18, 4.2% from 18 to 24, 33.8% from 25 to 44, 23.9% from 45 to 64, and 5.6% who were 65 years of age or older. The median age was 36 years. For every 100 females, there were 136.7 males. For every 100 females age 18 and over, there were 140.0 males.

The median income for a household in the town was $28,750, and the median income for a family was $46,250. Males had a median income of $19,583 versus $23,750 for females. The per capita income for the town was $14,102. There were 14.3% of families and 31.7% of the population living below the poverty line, including 75.0% of under eighteens and none of those over 64.

References

Towns in Mayes County, Oklahoma
Towns in Oklahoma